Gary Steele is a former American football coach. Steele served as the head football coach at the University of Pennsylvania from 1989 to 1991, compiling a record of 9–21.

Head coaching record

References

Year of birth missing (living people)
Living people
American football tight ends
Army Black Knights football players
Penn Quakers football coaches
African-American coaches of American football
African-American players of American football
21st-century African-American people